S Bannister (born 1787) was an early British equestrian performer and tightrope walker.

Life
Bannister was born in 1787. She was the daughter of James Bannister and she had a sister named Mary. Her father was one of the first people to take a circus on tour in Britain. When his equestrian show arrived in Stamford in 1804 she was with him.  She and the circus toured in Scotland and Northern England until her father went bankrupt (he later died in 1836). 

Her riding and tightrope skills however were said to create "much celebrity" and she went to work at Britain's first circus, Astley's Amphitheatre. When Astley died in 1821 she was the head horserider and she stayed and worked for the new manager, William Davis, and then for Charles Dibdin. She disappears from the records after marrying Edward Wilson. Although another source says that she married not Wilson but Clough and she appeared as Mrs Clough.

References

1787 births
British horse trainers
Tightrope walkers
Year of death unknown
18th-century circus performers